Matravers School is a mixed foundation secondary school and sixth form located in Westbury in the English county of Wiltshire. As a foundation school, Matravers is administered by Wiltshire Council. Pupils are admitted mainly from Bitham Brook Primary School, Bratton Primary School, Chapmanslade CE Primary School, Dilton Marsh CE Junior School, North Bradley CE Primary School, Westbury CE Junior School and Westbury Leigh CE Primary School.

Matravers School offers GCSEs and BTECs as programmes of study for pupils, while students in the sixth form have the option to study from a range of A-levels and further BTECs.

History
In his Will of 1814, John Matravers left £1,000 for educational purposes, of which £500 was to found a charity school for boys and girls living in the town of Westbury to be taught according to Joseph Lancaster's plan. By 1833, the school was teaching English, arithmetic, geography, and geometry to about two hundred children, for each of whom a charge of a penny a week was made. The annual expenditure was about £100, and income from endowments was £47.17s, with the balance being made up by voluntary contributions. At that time, "Matravers's School" was one of the largest and most advanced in Wiltshire for the children of working people. The school's first home was in Bratton Road, in a building later called the Old Athenaeum.

In 1844 a single schoolroom was built in Lower Road (now Leigh Road) for teaching girls separately, and by 1859 the new school there had about seventy girls. The boys continued in the original school, and both were affiliated with the British and Foreign School Society, being thus called "British Schools". In 1874 the Westbury British Boys' School moved into a room in the new Laverton Institute, and in 1907 its management was transferred to Wiltshire County Council and it became known as the Westbury Laverton Institute School. In 1925 the boys' school was closed, and the girls' school in Lower Road was expanded by two new classrooms to take both girls and boys on the same site, taking the new name of Westbury Senior Council School. In 1930 the school was enlarged again to take in children aged over eleven from Heywood, Chapmanslade, Corsley, Dilton Marsh, Bratton, Edington, and Erlestoke. In 1945 the name became the Westbury County Secondary Modern School, and after it became a comprehensive in the 1970s it changed again to Matravers School.

In February 2015 it was reported that the school had told the parents of special needs pupils to keep them at home during an Ofsted standards inspection.

References

External links

Secondary schools in Wiltshire
Foundation schools in Wiltshire
Westbury, Wiltshire